Marta Botía Alonso (born 15 September 1974 in Madrid) is a Spanish singer-songwriter. She has a sister named Lidia. Their father is a publicist and their mother is an Iberia director.

She grew up in Lavapiés block, in Madrid. Since she was a child, she showed a great interest in music and in the last course of high-school, she met Marilia Andrés Casares, with whom she created the band Ella baila sola, they split up in 2001.

Discography

With Ella Baila Sola
Ella Baila Sola (1996)
EBS (1998)
Marta y Marilia (2000)
Grandes Éxitos (2001)

Solo albums
Cumplir lo prometido (2003)
Martamente (2015)

References 

1974 births
Living people
Singers from Madrid
Writers from Madrid
21st-century Spanish singers
21st-century Spanish women singers